The 1983 Rallye des Pharaons was run in Egypt.

Results

Cars

Bikes

References

External links
 

Rallye des Pharaons
Rallye des Pharaons